Duroia hirsuta is a myrmecophyte tree species from the Amazon Forest. It is one of some 37 species of Duroia, which are shrubs or canopy trees in the family Rubiaceae, favouring ants (myrmecophilous), and occurring in Central America as far north as Mexico, the Amazon Basin, the Guiana Shield, the Brazilian Atlantic coast and planalto.

A number of Duroia species, and possibly all, are capable of biochemical interactions inhibiting the growth of neighbouring plants. Analysis of root extracts from Duroia hirsuta have yielded a strong plant growth inhibitor plumericin, a tetracyclic iridoid lactone, and duroin, another iridoid lactone.

This process, common amongst plants, is termed allelopathy. In the case of Duroia hirsuta, the chemical inhibitor is aided by the Lemon Ant, a resident on and in the tree, and playing an active role in suppressing and destroying plant growth in the vicinity of their host by injecting and spraying formic acid, and defending against herbivores - other ant species such as Azteca spp. and Allomerus octoarticulatus demerarae exhibit the same mutualism. The area around this understory tree is often devoid of all other plant types, leading to the local name "Devil's garden." The cost to the host plant for this protection is considerable, since the resident ants subject the tree to increased leaf cutting. Trees that grow outside the cleared area often have the living tissues of their trunks excavated and galled for ant accommodation.

References

External links 
New York Botanical Garden

Cordiereae
Plants described in 1888